State Route 166 (SR 166) is an east–west state highway in the northeastern portion of the U.S. state of Ohio.

Route description
State Route 166 travels through the northeastern portion of Geauga County and the western part of Ashtabula County.  No segment of this highway is a part of the National Highway System, a system of highways identified as most important for the economy, mobility and defense of the nation.

History
The debut of State Route 166 took place in 1923.  The original routing of State Route 166 consisted of the existing route of State Route 166 from its current western terminus northeast of Chardon to its junction with State Route 528, and State Route 528 from that intersection north to that highway's current northern terminus north of Madison.
  In 1939, State Route 166 was re-routed.  From the current junction of State Route 166 and State Route 528, State Route 166 was routed east, replacing what was formerly designated as State Route 522, to the intersection that marks State Route 166's current eastern terminus at State Route 534 west of Rock Creek.  In turn, State Route 528 was extended northward, replacing what was the north-south leg of State Route 166.

Major intersections

References

External links

State Route 166 Endpoint Photos

166
Transportation in Geauga County, Ohio
Transportation in Ashtabula County, Ohio